Tylopilus atronicotianus, commonly known as the false black velvet bolete, is a bolete fungus in the family Boletaceae. First described scientifically in 1998, it is known only from the eastern United States.

Taxonomy
The species was first described scientifically by Ernst Both, curator emeritus in mycology at the Buffalo Museum of Science, based on specimens he found growing in New York state. The specific epithet atronicotianus means "dark tobacco", and refers to the color of the cap. The mushroom is commonly known as the "false black velvet bolete".

Description

The cap margin is rolled inward in young specimens and unrolls as it matures. The cap surface is dry, smooth, and slightly shiny; its color ranges from light brown to olive-brown, although it tends to be darker in age. The flesh is whitish, but after it is cut or injured, will slowly stain pink to pinkish-red, eventually becoming black. The pore surface on the underside of the cap is initially white before turning reddish-brown in age. They are a bright brown color, and will stain black when injured.

The color of the stem is grayish to dark brown, and almost black at the base. The stem surface is finely tomentose (covered with short, dense, matted hairs), and usually lacks reticulations (a net-like pattern of rides present in some Tylopilus species), although it may be finely reticulated near the apex. The stem flesh is grayish to blackish in color. Mushrooms produce a reddish-brown spore print, while the spores themselves are narrowly oval, smooth, hyaline (translucent), and measure 7.5–10.5 by 4–5 μm. The edibility of the mushroom has not been determined. Fruit bodies have been used in mushroom dying to produce a variety of brownish colors.

The "black velvet bolete", Tylopilus alboater, is roughly similar in appearance, but is distinguished by a blacker cap with less brown color, and a velvety cap texture.

Habitat and distribution
Tylopilus atronicotianus is a mycorrhiza species, and is found in mixed tree stands with deciduous trees such as red oak, beech, and hemlock. The fruit bodies grow on the ground solitarily, scattered, or in groups. The species is fairly common in its range, which includes western New York and West Virginia, although the true limits of its distribution have yet to be precisely determined. The Mar Lodge Estate in Scotland claims to have the only site in the World for the Black False Bolete, published in the National Trust for Scotland Autumn and winter Magazine 2022.

See also
List of North American boletes

References

External links

atronicotianus
Fungi described in 1998
Fungi of North America